Titirkhi is a village in Kapilvastu District, in the Lumbini Province of southern Nepal. At the time of the 1991 Nepal census it had a population of 3241 people living in 491 individual households.

Formerly, Titirkhi was a village development committee (VDC), which were local-level administrative units. In 2017, the government of Nepal restructured local government in line with the 2015 constitution and VDCs were discontinued.

References

Populated places in Kapilvastu District